Struma Glacier is a glacier in eastern Livingston Island in the South Shetland Islands, Antarctica situated south of lower Kaliakra Glacier and north of Huron Glacier.  Bounded by Melnik Ridge to the north, Yankov Gap to the west and Bowles Ridge to the south, it is 4.8 km long and 1.5 km wide, and flows eastwards into Moon Bay south of Sindel Point.

First crossed by the Bulgarians Lyubomir Ivanov and Doychin Vasilev from Camp Academia on 28 December 2004, as part of Tangra 2004/05 survey.

The glacier is named after the Struma River in Bulgaria and forms part of the overland route between Pirdop Gate and Yankov Gap.

Location
Bulgarian topographic survey Tangra 2004/05 and mapping in 2005 and 2009.

See also
 List of glaciers in the Antarctic
 Glaciology

Maps
 L.L. Ivanov et al. Antarctica: Livingston Island and Greenwich Island, South Shetland Islands. Scale 1:100000 topographic map. Sofia: Antarctic Place-names Commission of Bulgaria, 2005.
 L.L. Ivanov. Antarctica: Livingston Island and Greenwich, Robert, Snow and Smith Islands. Scale 1:120000 topographic map. Troyan: Manfred Wörner Foundation, 2010.  (First edition 2009. )
 Antarctic Digital Database (ADD). Scale 1:250000 topographic map of Antarctica. Scientific Committee on Antarctic Research (SCAR). Since 1993, regularly upgraded and updated.
 L.L. Ivanov. Antarctica: Livingston Island and Smith Island. Scale 1:100000 topographic map. Manfred Wörner Foundation, 2017. 
 A. Kamburov and L. Ivanov. Bowles Ridge and Central Tangra Mountains: Livingston Island, Antarctica. Scale 1:25000 map. Sofia: Manfred Wörner Foundation, 2023.

Notes

References
 Struma Glacier SCAR Composite Antarctic Gazetteer
 Bulgarian Antarctic Gazetteer. Antarctic Place-names Commission. (details in Bulgarian, basic data in English)

External links
 Struma Glacier. Copernix satellite image

Glaciers of Livingston Island